The Magician (Star Film Catalogue no. 153.) is a 1898 French short black-and-white silent trick film, directed by Georges Méliès, featuring a wizard, a Pierrot and a sculptor in a rapid series of jump cuts. The film is, "another exercise in the art of the jump-cut," according to Michael Brooke of BFI Screenonline, "in the tradition of Georges Méliès' earlier A Nightmare (Le Cauchemar, 1896) and The Haunted Castle (Le Château hanté, 1897)."

Synopsis
A wizard conjures a table and a box out of thin air, and then vanishes as he jumps toward the box. Pierrot emerges from the box and takes a seat, when suddenly a banquet appears on the table, but it vanishes along with the table and chair before he can eat. A man in an Elizabethan doublet taps him on the shoulder and he is transformed into a Renaissance sculptor. Lifting a half finished bust onto a pedestal he prepares to set to work on it with a hammer and chisel only for it to come to life and snatch his tools from him. He attempts to embrace the sculpture only for it to disappear and reappear in a variety of poses. Finally the Elizabethan man reappears to kick him in the rump.

Current status
Given its age, this short film is available to freely download from the Internet.

References

External links 
 
 The Magician on YouTube

French silent short films
French black-and-white films
Films directed by Georges Méliès
Films about magic and magicians
1898 short films
1890s French films